Angels of Sin (original French title: Les anges du péché) was the first feature film directed by Robert Bresson. Made in 1943, nine years after his comedy short Public Affairs, it was Bresson's only film released during the German occupation of France. Working titles included Bethany, and Bresson's favored title The Exchange, but producers felt these titles weren't sensational enough.

This film was made with a cast of professional actors, an aspect it shares with Bresson's next film, Les dames du Bois de Boulogne, which would be his last done that way. Though usually seen as being the most "conventional" of Bresson's features, the religious subject matter and the directness of the film's style is seen by many as auspicious of the director's later work.

Bresson collaborated on the film's screenplay with Raymond Leopold Bruckberger, a Dominican priest, and the noted dramatist Jean Giraudoux, who received top billing on the film's posters above the then-unknown Bresson.

Synopsis
Anne-Marie (Renée Faure), a well–off young woman, decides to become a nun, joining a convent that rehabilitates female prisoners. Through their program, she meets a woman named Thérèse (Jany Holt) who refuses any help because she says she was innocent of the crime for which she was convicted. After being released from prison, Thérèse murders the man she feels is responsible for her imprisonment and comes to seek sanctuary from the law in the convent. Anne-Marie clashes with her sisters and elders over her zealousness to reform Thérèse, who manipulates and antagonizes her.

Bressonian trademarks
Though fairly conventional for its time in its approach to narrative filmmaking, Angels of Sin nonetheless contains elements which would later become common in Bresson's work, including a featuring of ellipsis: the shop owner is hardly visible throughout a sequence in which Thérèse buys a gun; there is also little context around the relationship of Thérèse and the man she murders (who, when shot, is only shown in silhouette). Additionally, the film has a prison setting, which would recur in the films A Man Escaped (1956), Pickpocket (1959), The Trial of Joan of Arc (1962), and L'Argent (1983). Lastly, the film ends with a shot of crossed hands being handcuffed: this form of close-up on hands became one of Bresson's most famous stylistic trademarks, and this particular arrangement of the cuffed hands is repeated in the aforementioned The Trial of Joan of Arc.

Though not a Bressonian trademark itself, the film also utilizes more fades to black than is common in other French films of the time, showing an early experimentation with film editing.

References

External links
 

1943 films
1943 drama films
1940s French-language films
Films directed by Robert Bresson
French black-and-white films
French drama films
1940s French films